Im Chang-kyun is a South Korean rapper and songwriter, also known by the stage name I.M. He is a member of South Korean boy group Monsta X and has been a credited writer on the majority of their discography. Since Monsta X's debut in 2015, I.M has been involved in songwriting for the group's discography, primarily in writing his raps for all of their albums. In addition to Monsta X's discography, he writes and produces for his solo work and collaborative projects.

Since 2020, the songs he composed for Monsta X have charted on the Billboard World Digital Song Sales chart. For Monsta X's album Fatal Love, the song "Night View", on which he was both a writer and composer for, ranked number thirteen on the chart, without separate promotions or performances, as a single. "Rotate", the song in which he wrote and composed for Monsta X's ninth EP One of a Kind, also placed number thirteen on the chart.

In addition to his work in Monsta X, I.M debuted as a soloist on February 19, 2021 with his self-produced EP Duality, along the title track "God Damn". I.M was noted as showing versatility as an artist and expanding his musical style with his solo EP, when compared to his work in Monsta X. Furthermore, all the tracks from Duality charted on the weekly Billboard World Digital Song Sales chart, accounting for 20% of that week's chart when it was released.

As of January 2023, I.M has a total of 129 writing and producing credits registered with the Korea Music Copyright Association (KOMCA).

Songs
All credits are adapted from the KOMCA, unless stated otherwise.

2015

2016

2017

2018

2019

2020

2021

2022

2023

References

Im Chang-kyun, List of songs written by